There are at least 25 named mountains in Silver Bow County, Montana.
 Beals Hill, el. 
 Big Butte, el. 
 Big Rock, el. 
 Burnt Mountain, el. 
 Charcoal Mountain, el. 
 Coyote Hill, el. 
 Dickie Peak, el. 
 East Peak, el. 
 Feeley Hill, el. 
 Goat Mountain, el. 
 Gold Hill, el. 
 Granulated Mountain, el. 
 Grassy Granulated Mountain, el. 
 Hungry Hill, el. 
 King and Queen Hill, el. 
 Limekiln Hill, el. 
 Little Granulated Mountain, el. 
 Moffet Mountain, el. 
 Mount Fleecer, el. 
 Mount Humbug, el. 
 Negro Mountain, el. 
 Pandora Mountain, el. 
 Starlight Mountain, el. 
 Steep Mountain, el. 
 Timber Butte, el. 
 triton Plateau, el.

See also
 List of mountains in Montana
 List of mountain ranges in Montana

Notes

Silver Bow